Orleans Park School is a coeducational secondary school with academy status, located in Twickenham area of the London Borough of Richmond upon Thames, England. It is situated 10 miles south-west of central London.

Performance
As with other schools, latest exam results and related data are published in the Department for Education's national tables.

Location and history
The school is situated in part of the former grounds of nearby Orleans House. Covering , it opened on the existing site in 1973 and the building was extended in 1993.

Status
Orleans Park teaches pupils in years 7–13 (ages 11–19), with 8 tutor groups in each school year. Since 2014 there has been a Sixth Form, with 6 tutor groups in each of the two years.   The school gained the status of a Mathematics and Computing College in September 2003, then also became a Language College in September 2008. The school converted to academy status on 1 September 2012.

Uniform
The uniform consists of a maroon sweatshirt, a white shirt and grey trousers; both the skirt and the jumper display the school's  logo, interlocked letters O and P. The new uniform is grey skirt/trousers with a maroon v neck sweater with an added gold band around the v. There is also the Orleans park writing and logo in gold. Under this is a white shirt with a normal collar or a revered collar.

Catchment
Many pupils at Orleans Park come from  the following nearby primary schools: St. Stephen's School, Archdeacon Cambridge's School, St. Mary's School, Chase Bridge Primary School,  Orleans Primary , Ivybridge school and The Vineyard School.

Notable former pupils 
Heather Cowell, professional International rugby player who plays for both England Sevens and Harlequins. Played 3 times for England Red Roses (15s). A former international gymnast.
Cameron Cowell, professional rugby player who played 38 times for Englands Sevens team.
Claire Allan, Olympic 2016 Rugby Sevens player
Julian Dunkerton, co-founder of Superdry
Edd Gould, (1988-2012) creator of the web series Eddsworld
Josh Herdman, actor best known for playing Gregory Goyle in the Harry Potter films
Scott Overall, Olympic Marathon runner
Rufus Sewell, film, theatre and television actor
Fionn Whitehead, actor best known for his role in Dunkirk and Black Mirror's Bandersnatch.
John Yorke, TV executive and author

Notable former teachers
Greg Davies, comedian and actor who previously taught drama at the school. Best known for his role as Mr Gilbert in The Inbetweeners

See also
List of schools in Twickenham

References

External links 
 
 Orleans Park School Association

Secondary schools in the London Borough of Richmond upon Thames
Twickenham
Academies in the London Borough of Richmond upon Thames